Ulotrichopus sumatrensis is a moth of the  family Erebidae. It is found on Sumatra.

References

Moths described in 1928
Ulotrichopus
Moths of Asia